Zoë Robins is a New Zealand actress, who played Hayley Foster in Power Rangers: Ninja Steel and Nynaeve al'Meara in The Wheel of Time.

Career 

Robins had her first acting role at age 12 in The New Tomorrow. She attended The Actor’s Program, an acting course in Auckland. Her first major role was as the White Ranger in Power Rangers Ninja Steel. In August 2019 she was cast as Nynaeve al'Meara in Amazon's adaptation of The Wheel of Time. The series premiered in 2021.

Personal life 

Robins was born in Lower Hutt, Wellington, New Zealand. She has a son.

Filmography

Film

TV

References

External links
 

Living people
21st-century New Zealand actresses
New Zealand film actresses
Year of birth missing (living people)
People from Lower Hutt